Tofinho Beach (pt: Praia do Tofinho) or simply Tofinho is a tourist Beach, Monument and Residential area  in southeastern Mozambique.  This holiday settlement lies on the Indian Ocean coast, on the Ponta da Barra peninsula in Inhambane Province, 1.5km south of Tofo, 25km Northeast of Inhambane in Mozambique.

References

Populated places in Inhambane Province